Churfürstliche Fuchsjagd, also known as Die Fuchsjagd zur Kaiserzeit or Zeitgenössische Fuchsjagd, is an outdoor 1904 sculpture by Wilhelm Haverkamp, installed at Fasanerieallee in the Tiergarten, Berlin, Germany.

References

External links

 

1904 establishments in Germany
1904 sculptures
Foxes in art
Horses in art
Outdoor sculptures in Berlin
Sculptures of dogs
Sculptures of men in Germany
Statues in Germany
Tiergarten (park)